York Clifton Carriage Sidings was a stabling point located in York, North Yorkshire, England. The depot was situated on the East Coast Main Line and was near York station.

The depot code was YC.

History 
Before its closure in 1987, Class 08 shunters, Class 20, Class 31 and Class 55 locomotives could be seen at the depot.

References 

Railway depots in Yorkshire